Werner Georg Emil Lucas (27 December 1917 – 24 October 1943) was a German Luftwaffe military aviator during World War II, a fighter ace credited with 106 enemy aircraft shot down. The majority of his victories were claimed over the Eastern Front, with one claim over the Western Front.

Born in Berlin, Lucas volunteered for military service in the Luftwaffe of Nazi Germany in 1938. Following flight training, he was posted to Jagdgeschwader 3 (JG 3—3rd Fighter Wing) in 1941. He claimed his first aerial victories in July 1941 during Operation Barbarossa, the German invasion of the Soviet Union. Following his 57th aerial victory, he was awarded the Knight's Cross of the Iron Cross on 19 September 1942. He was then appointed Staffelkapitän (squadron leader) of the 4. Staffel (4th squadron) of JG 3 which he continued to lead on the Eastern Front. He claimed his 100th aerial victory on 21 July 1943.

In October 1943, Lucas and his unit were transferred to the Western Front fighting in Defense of the Reich. In this theatre, Lucas claimed his 106th and last aerial victory before he was killed in action in aerial combat with Supermarine Spitfires on 24 October 1943.

Military career
Lucas was born on 27 December 1917 in Berlin of the German Empire. Following flight training, he was posted to the 4. Staffel (4th squadron) of Jagdgeschwader 3 (JG 3—3rd Fighter Wing) on 8 February 1941. World War II in Europe had begun on Friday 1 September 1939 when German forces invaded Poland. At the time of his posting, II. Gruppe of JG 3 was based in Arques in northern France and fighting against the Royal Air Force. On 10 February 1941, II. Gruppe was ordered to return to Germany for a period of rest and reequipment. The unit arrived at Darmstadt-Griesheim on 16 February where they received a complement of the new Messerschmitt Bf 109 F-2 fighter aircraft.

On 25 April 1941, II. Gruppe began relocating back to the English Channel Front at Monchy-Breton. The Gruppe completed relocation on 4 May and flew its first mission on 7 May 1941. On 1 June 1941, II. Gruppe began its relocation to the Eastern Front. The ground elements moved immediately while the air elements followed on 8 June. On that day, they flew to Saint-Dizier and then to Böblingen. On the following day, they continued to Breslau-Gandau, now the Wrocław–Copernicus Airport in Poland, via Straubing.

Operation Barbarossa
In preparation for Operation Barbarossa, the German invasion of the Soviet Union, II. Gruppe headed further east on 18 June. Following a stopover at Kraków, the unit was moved to Hostynne. At the start of the campaign, JG 3 under the command of Major (Major) Günther Lützow was subordinated to the V. Fliegerkorps (5th Air Corps), under the command of General der Flieger (General of the Aviators) Robert Ritter von Greim, itself part of Luftflotte 4 (4th Air Fleet), under the command of Generaloberst (Colonel General) Alexander Löhr. These air elements supported Generalfeldmarschall (Field Marshal) Gerd von Rundstedt's Army Group South, with the objective of capturing Ukraine and its capital Kiev. At 17:00 on 21 June 1941, the 5th Air Corps, based at Lipsko, briefed the various unit commanders of the upcoming attack. That evening, Gruppenkommandeur (group commander) of II. Gruppe Lothar Keller informed his subordinates of the attack.

The invasion of the Soviet Union began on 22 June 1941. II. Gruppe flew its first missions on the Eastern Front shortly before 04:00, flying low attacks against Soviet airfields in the vicinity of Lvov in Ukraine. At 06:30 the Gruppe fought its first aerial battles. 4. Staffel claimed three victories and the Gruppenstab four. In the beginning of July 1941, the front in the vicinity of the northern sector of Army Group South became increasingly fluid. This necessitated the relocation of II. Gruppe to Volodymyr-Volynskyi. On 2 July, II. Gruppe claimed 23 aerial victories in the combat area west of Berdichev and Zhitomir, including the first aerial victory by Lucas. The rapid advance of German ground forces required II. Gruppe to move to Lutsk on 5 July, then to Dubno that evening and to Miropol on 10 July. That day, Lucas claimed three Tupolev TB-3 bombers shot down. He and his wingman, Oberleutnant (First Lieutenant) Franz Beyer, had encountered twelve TB-3s from 14 Tyazhyolyy Bombardirovochnyy Aviatsionnyy (14 TBAP—14th Heavy Bomber Aviation Regiment). The two pilots claimed five of the bombers destroyed while Soviet records indicate that seven were lost.

On 8 August 1941, Lucas became an "ace-in-a-day" for the first time, shooting down five Soviet bombers in combat near the Dnieper river. On 31 October 1941, II. Gruppe flew its last combat mission over the northern Crimean combat zone and was ordered to retreat to Germany for a period of rest and refurbishment. On 1 December 1941, JG 3 was given the honorary name "Udet" following the suicide of World War I fighter pilot and Luftwaffe Generalleutnant Ernst Udet.

Mediterranean Theatre
At Wiesbaden-Erbenheim airfield, II. Gruppe was equipped with Bf 109 F-4 trop as the unit was to be deployed in the Mediterranean Theatre. After almost two months of rest, II. Gruppe was ordered to transfer to Sicily in early January 1942. Lucas was awarded the German Cross in Gold on 27 March 1942. II. Gruppe flew its last combat mission over Malta on 25 April 1942. On 27 April, II. Gruppe arrived at Plzeň where it was placed under the command of Hauptmann (Captain) Kurt Brändle.

Eastern Front
After three weeks of rest, II. Gruppe was moved to the southern sector of the Eastern Front and placed under control of VIII. Fliegerkorps (8th Air Corps) on the left wing of Army Group South. On 15 July, II. Gruppe was moved to an airfield at Millerovo. Flying from this airfield, Lucas claimed his 33rd and 34th aerial victory. On 27 July 1942, Lucas flew on a fighter escort mission for nine Junkers Ju 87 dive bombers and claimed his 39th and 40th aerial victory. The flight was intercepted by Yakovlev Yak-7 fighters from 434 Istrebitelny Aviatsionny Polk (434 IAP—434rd Fighter Aviation Regiment). In this encounter, Lucas claimed two Yakovlev fighters shot down. It is possible that his opponents were Mládshiy Leytenánt Kukushin and Serzhánt Smirnov, who both were shot down that day.

On 20 August 1942, for the second time in his combat career, Lucas became an "ace-in-a-day". On his first combat mission of the day, he claimed an Ilyushin Il-2 dive bomber destroyed, followed by four Petlyakov Pe-2 bombers within six minutes, taking his total to 52 aerial victories. On 19 September 1942, Lucas received the Knight's Cross of the Iron Cross for 57 air victories. In November 1942, Lucas was appointed Staffelkapitän of the 4. Staffel of JG 3. He thus succeeded Hauptmann Gerhard Wendt who was posted to a staff position with Luftflotte 4. In December, Lucas volunteered for the Platzschutzstaffel (airfield defence squadron) of the Pitomnik Airfield. The Staffel, largely made up from volunteers from I. and II. Gruppe of JG 3, was responsible for providing fighter escort to Junkers Ju 52 transport aircraft and Heinkel He 111 bombers shuttling supplies for the encircled German forces fighting in the Battle of Stalingrad. On 21 July 1943, Lucas was credited with his 100th aerial victory. He was the 47th Luftwaffe pilot to achieve the century mark. During the Donbass Strategic Offensive, II. Gruppe supported the 6th Army on the Mius-Front. On 31 July 1943, II. Gruppe claimed 17 aerial victories in this sector, including two by Lucas, his last two claims on the Eastern Front. On 2 August, the Gruppe was ordered to return to Germany.

Defense of the Reich and death

The increasing daytime attacks of the United States Army Air Forces (USAAF) Eighth Air Force against targets in western Europe forced the Luftwaffe to transfer more and more fighter units from the Eastern Front back to Germany in Defense of the Reich. On 3 August 1943, II. Gruppes air elements arrived at Uetersen Airfield in northern Germany. On 20 October, the USAAF targeted Düren. II. Gruppe intercepted the bombers near Venlo but were fended off by the escorting Republic P-47 Thunderbolt fighters. Elements of II. Gruppe managed to reach the bombers on their return. Two Boeing B-17 Flying Fortress bombers were shot down, including one by Lucas.

Whilst with JG 3 flying from Schiphol, he was killed in combat with Supermarine Spitfires, possibly escorting USAAF B-17 Flying Fortress bombers, on 24 October 1943. His Bf 109 G-6 (Werknummer 27080 —factory number) crashed in the city centre of Leiden, Netherlands. He on purpose, crashed his aircraft in the courtyard of a hospital on the Hooigracht, thus taking no other people with him than his 106 kills.

Summary of career

Aerial victory claims
According to US historian David T. Zabecki, Lucas was credited with 106 aerial victories. Mathews and Foreman, authors of Luftwaffe Aces — Biographies and Victory Claims, researched the German Federal Archives and found records for 105 aerial victory claims, plus one further unconfirmed claim. This figure includes 104 aerial victories on the Eastern Front and a four-engined bomber over the Western Allies.

Victory claims were logged to a map-reference (PQ = Planquadrat), for example "PQ 47844". These sectors were then subdivided into 36 smaller units to give a location area 3 × 4 km in size.

Awards
 Honour Goblet of the Luftwaffe on 2 October 1941 as Unteroffizier and pilot
 German Cross in Gold on 27 March 1942 Feldwebel in the 4./Jagdgeschwader 3
 Knight's Cross of the Iron Cross on 19 September 1942 as Feldwebel and pilot in the 4./Jagdgeschwader 3 "Udet"

Notes

References

Citations

Bibliography

Further reading

 
 
 

1917 births
Luftwaffe pilots
Military personnel from Berlin
German World War II flying aces
Luftwaffe personnel killed in World War II
Aviators killed by being shot down
1943 deaths
Recipients of the Gold German Cross
Recipients of the Knight's Cross of the Iron Cross
Burials at Ysselsteyn German war cemetery